Carlos Renato Frederico (born 21 February 1957), best known as Renato, is a former association footballer who played as an offensive midfielder.

Club career
In his career, Renato played for clubs Guarani (1975–1980), São Paulo (1980–1984), Botafogo (1985), Atlético Mineiro (1986–1989), in Japan with Nissan Motors / Yokohama Marinos (1989–1992), Kashiwa Reysol (1993), Ponte Preta (1994–1996) and Esporte Clube Taubaté (1997).

He won one Campeonato Brasileiro Série A (1978), two São Paulo State Tournament (1980, 1981), two Minas Gerais State Tournament (1986, 1988) and one Japan Soccer League Division 1 (1990). He received the Brazilian Silver Ball Award in 1987.

International career
Renato obtained 22 international caps with the Brazil national football team between July 1979 to October 1983, scoring three goals. He was on the roster for the 1982 FIFA World Cup, and was named on the substitute's bench for several matches, but did not actually play during the tournament.

Career statistics

Club

International

Honours
Individual
 Japan Soccer League First Division Top Scorer: 1989–90, 1990–91

References

External links
 
 
 

1957 births
Living people
Brazilian footballers
Brazilian expatriate footballers
Association football midfielders
Clube Atlético Mineiro players
Botafogo de Futebol e Regatas players
Guarani FC players
Associação Atlética Ponte Preta players
São Paulo FC players
Kashiwa Reysol players
Expatriate footballers in Japan
Campeonato Brasileiro Série A players
Japan Soccer League players
J1 League players
Yokohama F. Marinos players
1982 FIFA World Cup players
1983 Copa América players
Brazil international footballers